Cortes, officially the Municipality of Cortes,  is a 5th class municipality in the province of Bohol, Philippines. According to the 2020 census, it has a population of 18,344 people.

The town fiesta is held every 16 January in honor of the holy child Jesus, the Santo Niño.

History

The history of Cortes dates back to pre-Hispanic times – there already was a form of government way before the coming of the Spaniards. The town was known as "Malabago" after its chief, who was a contemporary of King Lomod, otherwise known as Tamblot – the first Boholano to raise arms against the Spanish conquistadors.

The Malabago settlement was situated in the upland territory of the present day Cortes near the Abatan River while that of Tamblot was at barangay Viga in the lowlands of Antequera which stretches to the riverside valleys opposite that of Malabago beyond the present day Abatan Bridge. The people of Malabago have a culture of their own and recorded their day-to-day activities in their own writing using unique characters which they carved out on a piece of bamboo using a knife called panggi or supok. Malabago then was a farming community that cultivated the land and made rice paddies in the north and east lowlands.

Tamblot's reign started in early 1600 AD and the uprising in 1621 was triggered when a Spanish priest want to take back a silver church bell (Lingganayng Ugis) which he gave to Tamblot in order to put it up in a church he built at Malabago. Tamblot resented such a move; refused to give the bell back and so started the feud between him and the Spaniards. Supporting Tamblot during the uprising, the Malabago settlement was destroyed by the Spaniards in 1621.

The settlement was transferred to Bahian which was also destroyed by the Spaniards. Again the people settled at Ylaya at the upper part of the river. Not accessible by boats, the people had to berth near the mouth of the river which they eventually called as "Dayhangan", meaning "berthing place".

The people chose to live near the mouth of the river and along the swamps. Their main livelihood was to catch fish, so the new settlement was called "Pamingwitan" ('a place where one can catch fish using a fishing rod'). In 1793 or 94, an independent parish was established.

"Pamingwitan" was renamed "Cortes". The town was probably established in 1862 during the construction of the Catholic church with the settlements of Malabago, Pamingwitan and Dayhangan jointed into one and called "Pueblo de Cortes". Toponymy suggests: 

The parish was dedicated to the Santo Niño. The inhabitants of the town were baptized and given instructions in the Catholic faith. Although the church was built in 1880, the bell tower's upper register was completed only in the 20th century. A boys' school building was constructed in 1895.

The town of Cortes played a prominent role during World War II. The inhabitants of the town formed a bolo battalion to fight the Japanese Invaders. Yet in 1942, the town was overwhelmed by the Japanese; houses were burned down and the school building was occupied and used as a garrison. Cortes was liberated from the Japanese a few days after the arrival of the Americans in Tagbilaran on 11 April 1945. In less than a month, the whole province of Bohol was officially declared liberated on 25 May 1945, by Major General William H. Arnold, Commander of the Americal Division.

Geography
Its nearest neighbor along the national highway to the north is the town of Maribojoc.

Barangays

Cortes comprises 14 barangays:

Climate

Demographics

Medium of discourse is usual Visayan (Cebuano), but English is the medium of instruction in all schools in the town starting from the primary grades. People also understand Filipino.

The people of Cortes in majority are Roman Catholics.

Economy

Cortes is the site of the southern Industrial Projects and its subsidiary, Rolling Mills, which produces colored and non-colored galvanized iron for roofing. Rolling Mills is situated high up on a plateau overlooking the Abatan River.

The town is known for its handmade paper and papercrafts, similar to washi, but made with indigenous fibers.

The town is also known for handmade paper products chosen now as the town's priority product under the Department of Trade and Industry's One Town, One Product (OTOP) Program. Aside from the manufacturing and handicraft industries, the people of Cortes are also into agribusiness.

Sand taken from the Abatan River, and which usually finds its way to construction sites in Tagbilaran, is likewise another source of income for the people of Cortes. Flat-bottomed boats made of marine plywood carry the sand which has to be dug up from the river bed with waist-high waters – back-breaking work for those involved.

The Local Government Unit (LGU) of Cortes is also developing eco-tourism. One major project is the development of the docking port, envisaged to be the starting point for cruises on the Abatan River, which flows through five towns.

Other projects include the establishment of daycare centers in each of the town's 14 barangays. Health stations will also be constructed. The nine sources of water supply are now installed with automatic chlorinator injection system to insure the health of residents. A reservoir will also be constructed in De la Paz.

Tourism
The town of Cortes has several tourism sites that yet need further development in order to attract foreign tourists. The Bacong River Heritage Conservation Tour for paddling and river trekking enthusiasts has been set up. Other sites such as the Larga Vista, an old stone building and the municipal hall are must-see.

Abatan River

The Abatan River is one of its natural assets. It opens at the Cortes nipa swamp, the most extensive nipa swamp in Bohol.

In former days when roads were scarce, the river served as a waterway for the people to and from the interior towns. Now, the government has seen its potential for tourism after the success of the Loboc River tours and it is now being developed.

Kayak exploration and stand-up paddle boarding are now available and can be arranged.

Cortes church

The church of Cortes is the Santo Niño parish church. It is situated high up on a hill and like all Bohol churches is cruciform shape. The church dates back to the 19th century although the bell tower's upper register was not completed until the 20th century.

The church is made up of cut coral stone blocks. A portico is in front of an older façade and floral carving frames the doorway. It has frescoes on its ceilings. The main retablo has twisted Solomonic columns and profusely carved flanges in the baroque idiom.

Bilibili Spring
Bilibili Spring is another site envisioned for development by the local government for it will be the first stop of the proposed river cruise. The spring is located in Malayo Norte.

References

External links

 [ Philippine Standard Geographic Code]
 Cortes
Municipality of Cortes
History of Cortes
Cortes Municipality

Municipalities of Bohol
1862 establishments in the Philippines